, also known by the stage name , is a Japanese voice actor who is affiliated with Aoni Production.

Voice roles

Television animation 
Atashin'chi (Yoshioka)
Aoki Densetsu Shoot (Shinichi Nitta)
Mobile Suit Gundam SEED (Ahmed El Fasi)
Marvel Disk Wars: The Avengers (Norman Osborn/Green Goblin)
Konjiki no Gash Bell!! (Mamoru Iwashima)
Dragon Ball Z (Ikose, Jewel, Obake, Saibamen)
Dragon Ball GT (Baby)
Dragon Ball Kai (Gregory)
Dragon Ball Super (Quitela, kettol, koitsukai e viara)
Beyblade (Ananda)
Sailor Moon R (Shinozaki)
Stitch! (Perorin (ep. 11))
GeGeGe no Kitaro (90s) (Kashabo (ep. 61))
Futari wa Pretty Cure Max Heart (Horpun)
Bobobo-bo Bo-bobo (Sakana)
RockMan.EXE (MegaMan NT Warrior) (Dekao Oyama) (Dex Oyama)
One Piece (Chess, Risky Brother, Antonio, Speed Jiru, Peseta, Skull, Charlotte Mascarpone and Kaku from Wano)
Shirt Tales (Buck Beaver from "The Big Foot Incident" and "Dinkel's Ark")
Ojarumaru (Ken)
Kagewani (Takeru (ep. 1), Sanjou (ep. 2))
Midnight Horror School (Zobie)

OVA 
Twinbee (Zakobī)

Tokusatsu
Juukou B-Fighter (Mercenary Iruba (ep. 16))
B-Fighter Kabuto (Water Dwelling Beast Kapparapa (ep. 20))
Mirai Sentai Timeranger (Tac)
Tokusou Sentai Dekaranger (Juuzaian Braidy (ep. 6), Sudolaian Girenu (ep. 48))
GoGo Sentai Boukenger (Tsukumogami Mamorigami (ep. 35))
Kamen Rider Wizard Original DVD (Gargoyle)
Uchu Sentai Kyuranger (Manavil (ep. 22))

Video games 
Summon Night: Swordcraft Story 2 (Ryouga)
Mega Man Network Transmission (Dex Oyama)
Star Fox: Assault (Andrew Oikonny, NUS64)
Dragon Ball GT: Final Bout (Super Baby)
Dragon Ball Z: Budokai 3 (Saibamen)
Dragon Ball Z: Budokai Tenkaichi series (Baby)
Dragon Ball Z: Budokai Tenkaichi 2 (Saibamen and Baby)
Dragon Ball Z: Infinite World (Saibamen and Super Baby 2)
SegaSonic the Hedgehog (Mighty the Armadillo)
Yu-Gi-Oh! Monster Capsule: Breed & Battle (Ryo Bakura)

Dubbing
The Adventures of Jimmy Neutron: Boy Genius as Sheen Estevez
Thomas the Tank Engine & Friends as Toad (Seasons 4-7), Troublesome Trucks (Season 5), Stephen Hatt (Season 5) 
Lights, Camera, ACTION! Wiggles TV Series as Greg Wiggle

Other Japanese
Pinocchio's Daring Journey (Lampy)

External links 
Yūsuke Numata at Aoni Production (Japanese)

1968 births
Japanese male video game actors
Japanese male voice actors
Living people
Male voice actors from Kanagawa Prefecture
20th-century Japanese male actors
21st-century Japanese male actors
Aoni Production voice actors